James Edwin "Ed" Worley is a former Democratic member of the Kentucky Senate, representing the 34th District from 1999 to 2011. He was Minority Floor Leader from 2003 to 2011.

External links
Kentucky Legislature – Senator Ed Worley official government site
Project Vote Smart – Senator James Edwin 'Ed' Worley (KY) profile
Follow the Money – Ed Worley
2008 2006 2004 2002 2000 1998 campaign contributions
KentuckyVotes.org – Sen. Ed Worley bills introduced and voting record
 public records

Kentucky state senators
1956 births
Living people
People from Williamson, West Virginia